The 1998 Northwest Missouri State Bearcats football team represented Northwest Missouri State University during the 1998 NCAA Division II football season. The team was led by fifth-year head coach Mel Tjeerdsma played their home games at Bearcat Stadium in Maryville, Missouri, which has been the Bearcat's home stadium since 1917.

Schedule

References

Northwest Missouri
Northwest Missouri State Bearcats football seasons
NCAA Division II Football Champions
Mid-America Intercollegiate Athletics Association football champion seasons
College football undefeated seasons
Northwest Missouri State Bearcats football